Desheh (also Romanized as Deshah and Disheh) is a village in Howli Rural District, in the Central District of Paveh County, Kermanshah Province, Iran. At the 2006 census, its population was 1,478, in 358 families.

This village has improved a lot in recent years. One of its developments is the asphalt of main roads that finished by August 2017.

References 

Populated places in Paveh County